The 1999 Cupa României Final was the 61st final of Romania's most prestigious cup competition. The final was played at the Stadionul Naţional in Bucharest on 16 June 1999 and was contested between Divizia A sides Steaua București and Rapid București. The cup was won by Steaua on penalties.

Route to the final

Match details

References

External links
 Official site 

Cupa României Final, 1999
Cupa României Finals
1999
FC Steaua București matches
Cupa Romaniei Final 1999